The 1981–82 Maltese Premier League was the 2nd season of the Maltese Premier League, and the 67th season of top-tier football in Malta.  It was contested by eight teams, and Hibernians F.C. won the championship.

League standings

Third Place tie-breaker
With both Zurrieq and Floriana level on 16 points, a play-off match was conducted to qualification for the UEFA Cup

Results

References
Malta – List of final tables (RSSSF)

Maltese Premier League seasons
Malta
1981–82 in Maltese football